Dear M.F. is an EP album by Canadian rock band Big Sugar.  It was released in 1995 on Hypnotic Records.

Track listing
 "Dear Mr. Fantasy" – (Chris Wood, Jim Capaldi, Steve Winwood) — 5:05
 "Goodbye Train" – (Gordie Johnson) — 4:45
 "Motherless Children" – (traditional, arranged by Gordie Johnson) – 4:18
 "A Night in Tunisia" – (Dizzy Gillespie, Frankie Paparelli) — 4:02
 "Leadbelly (Dub)" – (Johnson, Garry Lowe, Kelly Hoppe, Stich Wynston) – 7:36

Personnel
Gordie Johnson — guitars, bass, vocals
Patrick Ballantyne – acoustic guitar
Kelly Hoppe – harmonica, melodica, steel guitar
Garry Lowe – bass
Al Cross – drums
Stich Wynston – drums

Year-end charts

References

Big Sugar albums
1995 EPs